This is a list of films which placed number-one at the weekend box office in Australia during 2002. Amounts are in Australian dollars.

See also 
 List of Australian films – Australian films by year

2002
Australia
2002 in Australian cinema